John Kenneth Blair (born 10 February 1966) is an Alliance Party politician, who has been a Member of the Northern Ireland Assembly (MLA) for South Antrim since 2018. He is the first openly gay member of the Assembly.

Political career

Early career (1997-2005) 
John Blair was elected as a councillor to Newtownabbey Borough Council for the Newtonabbey Ratepayers' Association in the 1997 Local Elections, but lost his seat at the 2001 Local Elections after his vote decreased from 6.7% to 3.7%. He attempted to take a different seat the following 2005 elections, but was unsuccessful.

Councillor (2011-2018) 
Blair was elected to Newtownabbey Borough Council in the 2011 local elections, representing Antrim Line DEA as an Alliance candidate. He topped the poll and was elected on the first count with 15.96% of the FPVs. He was re-elected to the new Antrim and Newtownabbey Borough Council in 2014, representing the Glengormley Urban DEA.

Member of the Legislative Assembly (2018-) 
In 2018, he was co-opted to fill former Alliance Party Leader David Ford's Assembly seat in South Antrim, following David Ford's resignation. Blair has been appointed to the British–Irish Parliamentary Assembly and the Northern Ireland Policing Board.

He ran as the Alliance Party candidate for South Antrim in the 2019 General Election, increasing Alliance's share of the vote by 11.7% - from 7.4% to 19.4% - and taking third place.

Blair ran at the 2022 Assembly election, taking 7,315 FPVs (16%), and was re-elected on Stage 2.

Personal life
Blair is the first openly gay MLA to sit in the Northern Ireland Assembly. Blair has faced harassment due to his sexuality, including from a DUP councillor who sat on the same policing board alongside Blair.

See also
Alliance Party of Northern Ireland
List of the first LGBT holders of political offices in the United Kingdom

References

External links

1966 births
Living people
Alliance Party of Northern Ireland MLAs
Northern Ireland MLAs 2017–2022
LGBT politicians from Northern Ireland
Gay men from Northern Ireland
People from Newtownabbey
Members of Newtownabbey Borough Council
Northern Ireland MLAs 2022–2027
Gay politicians